Malente is a municipality in the district of Ostholstein, in Schleswig-Holstein, Germany. It is about 5 km northwest of Eutin and 35 km north of Lübeck.

The historian Sigrid Jahns was born in Malente.

References

External links
  

Ostholstein